Kavuluru is a village near Vijayawada and Kondapalli in the Krishna district of Andhra Pradesh in India.

References 

Villages in Krishna district